The Grand Canyon National Park Act, 65th Congress, was the U.S. federal law that established Grand Canyon National Park as the nation's seventeenth national park. It was signed into law on February 26, 1919, by President Woodrow Wilson.

See also
List of national parks of the United States
National Park Service
United States Department of the Interior

Notes

External links
U.S. Statutes at Large, Vol. 40, Part 1, Chap. 44, pp. 1175-78. "An Act To establish the Grand Canyon National Park in the State of Arizona." S. 390, Public Act No. 277

1919 in law
65th United States Congress